Hayley Carter and Luisa Stefani were the defending champions but chose not to participate.

Arianne Hartono and Olivia Tjandramulia won the title, defeating Katharina Gerlach and Daniela Seguel in the final, 6–1, 6–3.

Seeds

Draw

Draw

References
Main Draw

Copa LP Chile - Doubles